Marian Józef Daszyk (born 9 May 1961 in Jurowce) is a Polish politician. He was elected to the Sejm on 25 September 2005, getting 8276 votes in 22 Krosno district as a candidate from the League of Polish Families list.

See also
Members of Polish Sejm 2005-2007

External links
Marian Daszyk - parliamentary page - includes declarations of interest, voting record, and transcripts of speeches.

1961 births
Living people
People from Sanok County
Movement for Reconstruction of Poland politicians
Members of the Polish Sejm 2005–2007
League of Polish Families politicians